The Swiss Women Volleyball League is an annual competition of women's volleyball teams in Switzerland. It has been held since 1958. Managed and organized by the Swiss Volley.

It is the country's premier league for women’s volleyball.

History
In the 2018/19 season in League A 8 teams had participated: "Dudingen, Pfeffingen, Canty (Schaffhausen), Vitéos NUC (Neuchâtel), Lugano, Franches-Montagne (Senlege), Geneva, Chaesaux. The championship title was won by "Viteyos NUK", who won the final series by beating "Pfeffingen" 3-1 (1:3, 3:1, 3:0, 3:0). The 3rd place went to Dudingen.

Winners list

Titles by club

References

External links
 Swiss Volley
  Swiss League. women.volleybox.net 

Switzerland
Sports leagues established in 1958
1958 establishments in Switzerland
Volleyball in Switzerland
Swiss Women's League
Professional sports leagues in Switzerland